Agnisaira Krishnasavaran is a rural municipality in Saptari District in the Sagarmatha Zone of south-eastern Nepal. At the time of the 2017 Nepal census it had a population of 27,129 people living in 2265 individual households.

It is 462 km east of Kathmandu and 18 km North of Rajbiraj

Geography 
This place is located on the apart side of Mahendra Highway.

Economy

Transportation

Climate

Festivals and celebrations 
 Jur Sital
 Raksha Bandhan
 Jitiya
 Dasain
 Deepaawali
 Chhath
 Samaa Chakewa
 Maaghe Sankraanti
 Holi
 Seeruwaa
 Ramdan
 Eid
 Bakar-Eid

Religious places 
 Agnisaira
 Krishnasavaran
 Kajaraadah
 Gormuraain

Rivers and bridges 
 Mahuli River
 Gehari River
 Dumarjor River
 Amsot River
 Murkutawa Bridge
 Herna Bridge
 Dudhela Bridge
 Bihai

Health

Education  
Ward No. 1:
Public Schools
 Shree Thakur Ji Secondary School, Jandaul, Saptari
 Shree Janachetana Secondary School, Ghongidaha, Bhawanipur, Saptari
Private/Boarding School
  P. R. Memorial School, Ghongidaha, Bhawanipur, Saptari
Ward No. 2:
Public Schools
 Shree Sa. De. Fu. Ja. Secondary School, Sitapur, Saptari
 Shree Rastriya Primary School, Sitapur, Saptari
 Shree Ja. Rastriya Primary School, Sitapur, Saptari
Private/Boarding School
 Crimson Boarding School, Chandani Chowk, Saptari
 Maa English Boarding School, Sitapur, Kalauni, Saptari
Ward No. 3:
Public Schools
 Shree Janata Basic School, Matigadhi, Saptari
 Shree Janata Basic School, Hariharpur, Saptari
Private/Boarding School
 Surya English Boarding School, Matigadha, Saptari
Ward No. 4:
Public Schools
 Shree Mahikar Secondary School, Prasbani, Saptari
 Shree Shyam Rastriya Primary School, Prasbani, Saptari
 Shree Rastriya Primary School, Belha, Saptari
 Shree Basic School, Banauli, Saptari
 Shree Ram Janaki Primary School, Tengry, Saptari
Ward No. 5:
Public Schools
 Shree Basic School, Chhapki, Saptari
 Madarsa School, Chhapki, Saptari
 Shree Hirawati Basic School, Bakdhuwa, Saptari
Ward No. 6:
Public Schools
 Shree Saamudaayik Primary School, Mohanpur, Saptari
 Shree Rastriya Secondary School, Ratwala, Saptari
Private/Boarding School
 The Everest Secondary English Boarding School, Mahuli, Saptari
 Shree Aadarsha Secondary School, Mahuli, Saptari                             Private/Boarding School
 Galaxy Boarding School, Mahuli, Saptari
 Merryland Applied Academy, Mahuli, Saptari

Banks 
 Machhapuchhre Bank Limited, Mahuli Bazaar, Saptari
 Kaamana Sewa Bikas Bank Limited, Mahuli Bazaar, Saptari

Organizations

Markets 
Rural Market Centers 
Tapeshwori Hatbazar
Itaharwa Sitapur Kaloni hHatbazar
 Jandoul Hatbazar
Raghunathpur Hatbazar Chandani chowk
Shree Ram Janaki Hatbazar
Bargachhi Hatbaza
RAKHADHATI krisi Hatbazar-HARIHARPUR
Bishalchowk Hatbazar
Prasbani Htbazar
Banouli Hatbazar
Mahuli Bazar

References 

2016 establishments in Nepal
Rural municipalities in Saptari District
Rural municipalities of Nepal established in 2017
Rural municipalities in Madhesh Province